Twelve national teams competed in the men's Olympic field hockey tournament at the 2012 Summer Olympics in London. Sixteen players were officially enrolled in each squad. Two reserve players could also be nominated to be available should a player enrolled in the official squad become injured during the tournament.

Pool A

Australia
The following is the Australian roster in the men's field hockey tournament of the 2012 Summer Olympics.

Head Coach: Ric Charlesworth

Jamie Dwyer (Vice-captain)
Liam de Young (Vice-captain)
Simon Orchard
Glenn Turner
Chris Ciriello
Matthew Butturini
Mark Knowles (C)
Russell Ford *
Eddie Ockenden
Joel Carroll
Matthew Gohdes
Tim Deavin
Matthew Swann
Nathan Burgers (GK)
Kieran Govers
Fergus Kavanagh

Reserves:
 Kiel Brown
 Andrew Charter (GK)

Great Britain
The following is the Great Britain roster in the men's field hockey tournament of the 2012 Summer Olympics.

Head Coach: Jason Lee

Glenn Kirkham
Ashley Jackson
Harry Martin
Matthew Daly
Jonty Clarke
Robert Moore
Ben Hawes
Alastair Wilson
Barry Middleton (C)
James Tindall
Iain Mackay
Iain Lewers
James Fair (GK)
Nicholas Catlin
Daniel Fox
Richard Smith

Reserves:
 Richard Mantell
 George Pinner (GK)

Spain
The following is the Spain roster in the men's field hockey tournament of the 2012 Summer Olympics.

Head Coach: Dani Martín

Francisco Cortés (GK)
Santi Freixa (C)
Sergi Enrique
Miguel Delas
Alex Fàbregas
Pol Amat
<li value=10>Eduard Tubau
<li value=11>Roc Oliva
<li value=13>Ramón Alegre
<li value=15>Jose Ballbe
<li value=16>Juan Fernández
<li value=17>Xavi Lleonart
<li value=18>Andrés Mir
<li value=19>Marc Salles (R)
<li value=20>Xavier Trenchs (GK) (R)
<li value=22>Manel Terraza
<li value=23>David Alegre
<li value=25>Pau Quemada

Pakistan
The following is the Pakistan roster in the men's field hockey tournament of the 2012 Summer Olympics.

Head Coach: Akhtar Rasool

<li value=1>I. Shah (GK)
<li value=2>Muhammad Irfan
<li value=3>Muhammad Rizwan Sr.
<li value=4>Muhammad Rizwan Jr.
<li value=5>Fareed Ahmed
<li value=6>Rashid Mehmood
<li value=7>Muhammad Waqas
<li value=8>Muhammad Umar Bhutta
<li value=9>Abdul Haseem Khan
<li value=10>Shakeel Abbasi
<li value=11>Sohail Abbas (C)
<li value=14>Muhammad Tousiq
<li value=15>Shafqat Rasool
<li value=16>Rehan Butt
<li value=17>Waseem Ahmed
<li value=18>Muhammad Imran

Reserves:
 Imran Butt (GK)
 Syed Kashif Shah

Argentina
The following is the Argentina roster in the men's field hockey tournament of the 2012 Summer Olympics.

Head Coach: Pablo Lombi

<li value=1>Juan Manuel Vivaldi (GK)
<li value=3>Ignacio Bergner
<li value=4>Matías Vila (C)
<li value=5>Pedro Ibarra
<li value=7>Facundo Callioni
<li value=8>Lucas Rey
<li value=9>Rodrigo Vila
<li value=10>Matias Enrique Paredes
<li value=11>Lucas Cammareri
<li value=12>Lucas Vila
<li value=17>Juan Martín Lopez
<li value=18>Santiago Montelli
<li value=24>Manuel Brunet
<li value=26>Agustin Mazzilli
<li value=27>Lucas Rossi
<li value=28>Gonzalo Peillat

Reserves:
<li value=15>Juan Espinosa (GK)
<li value=23>Matías González

South Africa
The following is the South African roster in the men's field hockey tournament of the 2012 Summer Olympics.

Head Coach: Gregg Clark

<li value=1>Jonathan Robinson
<li value=2>Wade Paton
<li value=3>Andrew Cronje
<li value=4>Lloyd Madsen
<li value=5>Austin Smith (C)
<li value=7>Timothy Drummond
<li value=8>Marvin Harper
<li value=9>Julian Hykes
<li value=10>Lloyd Norris-Jones
<li value=11>Lance Louw
<li value=14>Rhett Halkett
<li value=18>Thornton McDade
<li value=23>Erasmus Pieterse (GK)
<li value=25>Justin Reid-Ross
<li value=29>Ian Haley
<li value=30>Taine Paton
<li value=31>Clinton Panther

Reserves:
 Jacques Le Roux (GK)

Pool B

Germany
The following is the Germany roster in the men's field hockey tournament of the 2012 Summer Olympics.

Head Coach: Markus Weise

<li value=4>Maximilian Müller (C)
<li value=6>Martin Häner
<li value=7>Oskar Deecke
<li value=8>Christopher Wesley
<li value=9>Moritz Fürste
<li value=13>Tobias Hauke
<li value=14>Jan-Philipp Rabente
<li value=15>Benjamin Weß
<li value=17>Timo Weß
<li value=18>Oliver Korn
<li value=19>Christopher Zeller
<li value=21>Max Weinhold (GK)
<li value=22>Matthias Witthaus
<li value=23>Florian Fuchs
<li value=25>Philipp Zeller
<li value=26>Thilo Stralkowski

Reserves:
 Linus Butt
 Nicolas Jacobi (GK)

Netherlands
The following is the Netherlands roster in the men's field hockey tournament of the 2012 Summer Olympics.

Head Coach: Paul van Ass

<li value=1>Jaap Stockmann (GK)
<li value=3>Tim Jenniskens
<li value=4>Klaas Vermeulen
<li value=5>Marcel Balkestein
<li value=7>Wouter Jolie
<li value=8>Billy Bakker
<li value=9>Roderick Weusthof
<li value=12>Robbert Kemperman
<li value=13>Sander Baart
<li value=14>Teun de Nooijer
<li value=16>Floris Evers (C)
<li value=19>Bob de Voogd
<li value=20>Sander de Wijn
<li value=22>Rogier Hofman
<li value=24>Robert van der Horst
<li value=26>Valentin Verga
<li value=30>Mink van der Weerden

Reserves:
 Pirmin Blaak (GK)

South Korea
The following is the South Korea roster in the men's field hockey tournament of the 2012 Summer Olympics.

Head Coach: Cho Myung-jun

<li value=1>Lee Myung-ho
<li value=3>Jang Jong-hyun
<li value=5>Oh Dae-keun
<li value=6>Lee Nam-yong
<li value=7>Seo Jong-ho
<li value=8>Lee Seung-il
<li value=9>Yoon Sung-hoon
<li value=10>You Hyo-sik
<li value=11>Yeo Woon-kon
<li value=13>Kang Moon-kweon
<li value=14>Hyun Hye-sung
<li value=15>Cha Jong-bok
<li value=17>Hong Eun-seong
<li value=19>Kim Young-jin
<li value=23>Kang Moon-kyu
<li value=32>Nam Hyun-woo

Reserves:
 Cho Suk-hoon
 Kim Jae-hyeon

New Zealand
The following is the New Zealand roster in the men's field hockey tournament of the 2012 Summer Olympics.

Head Coach: Shane McLeod

<li value=4>Nicholas Haig
<li value=5>Andy Hayward
<li value=6>Simon Child
<li value=7>Blair Hopping
<li value=8>Dean Couzins (C)
<li value=9>Blair Hilton
<li value=10>Ryan Archibald
<li value=12>Bradley Shaw
<li value=17>Kyle Pontifex (GK)
<li value=18>Phil Burrows
<li value=25>Shea McAleese
<li value=27>Stephen Jenness
<li value=28>Richard Petherick
<li value=29>Hugo Inglis
<li value=31>Steve Edwards
<li value=32>Nick Wilson

Reserves:
 Hamish McGregor (GK)
 Arun Panchia

India
The following was the Indian roster in the men's field hockey tournament of the 2012 Summer Olympics.

Head Coach: Michael Nobbs

<li value=1>Ignace Tirkey
<li value=4>Sandeep Singh
<li value=6>Bharat Chettri (C, GK)
<li value=7>Manpreet Singh
<li value=8>Sardara Singh (VC)
<li value=10>Dharamvir Singh
<li value=12>V. R. Raghunath
<li value=13>Gurbaj Singh
<li value=14>Tushar Khandker
<li value=15>S. K. Uthappa
<li value=16>P. R. Shreejesh (GK)
<li value=17>Danish Mujtaba
<li value=18>Shivendra Singh
<li value=21>Gurwinder Singh Chandi
<li value=24>Sowmarpet Sunil
<li value=26>Birendra Lakra

Reserves:
 Sarvanjit Singh
 Kothajit Singh

Belgium
The following is the Belgium roster in the men's field hockey tournament of the 2012 Summer Olympics.

Head Coach: Colin Batch

[[Xavier Reckinger]]
<li value=5>[[Jerome Dekeyser]]
<li value=7>[[John-John Dohmen]]
<li value=8>[[Florent van Aubel]]
<li value=9>[[Maxime Luycx]]
<li value=10>[[Cedric Charlier]]
<li value=11>[[Benjamin Van Hove]]
<li value=12>[[Gauthier Boccard]]
<li value=13>[[Jeffrey Thys]]
<li value=17>[[Thomas Briels]]
<li value=19>[[Felix Denayer]]
<li value=21>[[Vincent Vanasch]] (GK)
<li value=22>[[Simon Gougnard]]
<li value=23>[[Alexandre De Saedeleer]]
<li value=27>[[Tom Boon]]
<li value=28>[[Jerome Truyens]] (C)
{{div col end}}
Reserves:
 [[Emmanuel Leroy]] (GK)
 [[Elliot Van Strydonck]] <section end=BEL />

References
{{Reflist}}

{{Field hockey at the Summer Olympics}}

{{DEFAULTSORT:Field hockey at the 2012 Summer Olympics - Men's team squads}}
[[Category:Field hockey at the 2012 Summer Olympics – Men's tournament|squads]]
[[Category:Field hockey players at the 2012 Summer Olympics| ]]
[[Category:Olympic field hockey squads|2012]]